In-Jin Yoon (born June 30, 1963) is a South Korean sociologist.

Early life and career
He was born in Hongseong, South Korea and raised in Daejeon until high school. He graduated from Korea University with a BA in sociology in August 1985. He received his Ph. D. from the University of Chicago and taught at the Asian American Studies Department of the University of California, Santa Barbara between 1992 and 1995 before he joined the Department of Sociology in Korea University. He is now professor of the Department of Sociology, Korea University and the former presidents of the Association for North Korean Migrants Studies and the Association for the Studies of Koreans Abroad, the head of the Brain Korea 21 Project Group for Conflict Society, the vice director of the Asiatic Research Institute of Korea University, and the president of the Korean International Migration Studies Association (http://kimanet.org). He also serves as the director of the Korea University Press. His research interests include social psychology, minorities, international migration, and multiculturalism.

Publications

 
His major publications include On My Own: Korean Businesses and Race Relations in America, Korean Diaspora: Migration, Adaptation, and Identity of Overseas Koreans, and North Korean Migrants: Lives, Consciousness, and Support Policy for Resettlement, South Koreans' Perceptions of Migrant Workers and Multicultural Society, and Migration and Transnational Space in Northeast Asia, Mutual Perceptions of North Korean Migrants and South Koreans, Trends and Tasks of Studies of Koreans Abroad, and the History of Koreas Abroad, History of Overseas Koreans, International Migration and Multiculturalism in Northeast Asia, Reflections on Multiculturalism in Korea and Its Prospects, Identity of Koreans, Theories and Practices of Diaspora and Transnationalism, the Current State of Overseas Koreans Community and Policy Tasks, Koreatowns and Korean communities Abroad,  and The Next Generation of Overseas Koreans and Mainstreaming.

References

1963 births
Living people
Academic staff of Korea University
South Korean sociologists
Social psychologists
Korea University alumni
University of Chicago alumni
University of California, Santa Barbara faculty
People from Hongseong County